Henk Lubberding  (born 4 August 1953 in Voorst) is a Dutch former professional road bicycle racer. He was a professional from 1977 to 1992.

As an amateur, he finished third in the 1976 Tour de l'Avenir. The following year he turned professional with the Dutch cycling team TI–Raleighof Peter Post. Lubberding stayed his entire career in teams directed by Post. In 1978, Lubberding was road race champion of the Netherlands and won a stage in the 1978 Tour de France, finishing eighth overall and best young rider. 
He was a good mountain climber despite being tall, and from the low lands of Holland.

After team leader Hennie Kuiper left, Lubberding and Paul Wellens became co-leaders and Lubberding performed well throughout 1979 with high placings in Paris–Nice, the Amstel Gold Race, Gent–Wevelgem, Tour de Romandie, Rund um den Henninger-Turm and the Critérium du Dauphiné Libéré. He won the Dutch road race title again and finished 18th in the 1979 Tour de France. His role of team leader ended in 1979.

Lubberding helped Jan Raas win the world championship in 1979. He also helped Joop Zoetemelk win the 1980 Tour de France. He won two more stages in the Tour de France and wore the yellow jersey as leader of the general classification in 1988.

Lubberding worked on his farm, even during his racing period.

He retired at the end of 1992 with 58 victories including Gent–Wevelgem.

Major results

1975
 1st Ronde van Limburg
1976
 3rd Overall Trophée Peugeot de l'Avenir
1st Stage 6 
1977
 2nd Tour du Haut Var
 7th Overall Vuelta a Andalucía
1978
 1st  Road race, National Road Championships
 1st Stage 4a Tour de Suisse
 2nd Overall Tour d'Indre-et-Loire
 6th Overall Paris–Nice
 8th Overall Tour de France
1st  Young rider classification
1st Stage 10 
 8th La Flèche Wallonne
 8th Grand Prix des Nations
 10th Overall Tour Méditerranéen
1979
 1st  Road race, National Road Championships
 1st Prologue Tour d'Indre-et-Loire
 2nd Overall Critérium du Dauphiné Libéré
 2nd Amstel Gold Race
 2nd Rund um den Henninger-Turm
 3rd Overall Tour de Romandie
1st Prologue 
 3rd Grand Prix de Cannes
 3rd Trofeo Baracchi (with Bert Oosterbosch)
 4th Overall Paris–Nice
 5th Road race, UCI Road World Championships
 5th Gent–Wevelgem
 5th E3 Prijs Vlaanderen
 8th Overall Tour de Suisse
1st Stage 9a 
 8th Brabantse Pijl
 9th Milano–Torino
 9th Züri-Metzgete
1980 
 1st Gent–Wevelgem
 1st Stage 7a (ITT) Volta a Catalunya
 2nd Overall Tour Méditerranéen
1st Stage 5 
 5th Overall Étoile de Bessèges
1st Stage 2 
 6th La Flèche Wallonne
 7th Overall Paris–Nice
 8th Road race, National Road Championships
 8th Overall Ronde van Nederland
1st Stage 5b (TTT) 
 9th Overall Grand Prix du Midi Libre
 10th Overall Tour de France
1st Stages 1b (TTT), 3 & 7a (TTT)
 10th Paris–Brussels
1981
 Tour de France
1st Stages 1b (TTT) & 4 (TTT)
 5th Overall Tour de Suisse
 5th E3 Prijs Vlaanderen
 6th Road race, National Road Championships
 6th Grand Prix Pino Cerami
 7th Overall Tirreno–Adriatico
 9th Overall Ronde van Nederland
1st Stage 5b (TTT) 
1982
 1st Stage 9a (TTT) Tour de France
 1st Stage 5b (TTT) Ronde van Nederland
 5th Road race, National Road Championships
 9th Gent–Wevelgem
1983
 1st Stage 4 Tour de Romandie
 2nd Road race, National Road Championships
 2nd Ronde van Limburg
 5th Liège–Bastogne–Liège
 7th Overall Volta a Catalunya
 8th Overall Ronde van Nederland
1st Stage 3b (TTT)
 10th Overall Tour de France
1st Stage 13 
 10th Overall Tour Méditerranéen
1984
 1st Stage 7 (TTT) Ronde van Nederland
 2nd Road race, National Road Championships
 6th La Flèche Wallonne
1985
 1st  Overall Tour of Norway
1st Stage 2
 1st Stage 4a Tour Méditerranéen
 1st Stage 5b (TTT) Ronde van Nederland
 4th Veenendaal–Veenendaal
 5th Züri-Metzgete
1986 
 8th Overall Étoile de Bessèges
 9th E3 Prijs Vlaanderen
1987 
 3rd Rund um den Henninger-Turm
1988
 Tour de France
1st Stage 2 (TTT)
Held  after Stage 5
 4th Grand Prix d'Isbergues
 10th Overall Ronde van Nederland
1989
 2nd Overall Tour de Trump
1st Stage 2
 8th Grand Prix d'Isbergues
1992
 6th Veenendaal–Veenendaal

Grand Tour general classification results timeline

See also
 List of Dutch cyclists who have led the Tour de France general classification

External links 

Official Tour de France results for Henk Lubberding

1953 births
Living people
People from Voorst
Dutch male cyclists
Dutch Tour de France stage winners
Tour de Suisse stage winners
Cyclists from Gelderland
20th-century Dutch people
21st-century Dutch people